The FIL World Luge Natural Track Championships 2009 took place 12–15 February 2009 in Moos, Italy. This was the second time the city hosted the event having done so in 1980.

Event preparations
Preparations for the track were inspected by World Cup champion Patrick Pigneter and local hero Evelyn Lanthaler. Infrastructure improvements at the finish area were improved, including enlargement of the parking lot. Both athletes were impressed with the venue itself even without it being iced.

Men's singles
14 February 2009 at 13:00 hours Central European Time (CET), then 15 February at 09:30 CET & 11:00 CET.

Pigneter won his third gold at these championships.

Women's singles
February 14, 2009 at 10:30 CET & 12:00 CET, then February 15 at 12:00 CET.

Gietl had the fastest times in the first two runs to upset two-time defending world champion Lavrentyeva.

Men's doubles
February 14, 2009 at 09:30 CET & 11:30 CET.

Pigneter and Clara won their second gold of the championships while Schopf and Schopf won their second silver. Patrick's father Raimund won world championship gold on the same track in 1980.

Mixed team
February 13, 2009 at 10:00 CET.

Lazarev competed both in the singles and doubles in the event for Russia.

Medal table

Notes and references

 (21 May 2008 article accessed 21 May 2008.)
Men's doubles natural track World Champions
Men's singles natural track World Champions
Mixed teams natural track World Champions
Women's singles natural track World Champions

FIL World Luge Natural Track Championships
2009 in luge
2002 in Italian sport
Luge in Italy